Madalitso Muthiya (born 8 February 1983) is a Zambian professional golfer. 

Muthiya took up golf at the age of six and at fifteen he caught the attention of Zambian president Frederick Chiluba, who asked an American, James Roth, to assist Muthiya in securing an athletic scholarship to a university. Roth arranged for Muthiya to play a junior tournament in the United States, the 1999 Nolan Henke/Patty Berg Junior Masters in Fort Myers, Florida. Muthiya won in the 16- to 18-year-old age group. He went on to play college golf at the University of New Mexico before turning professional in 2005. 

Muthiya finished second in the 2006 Zambian Open and joined the Canadian Tour in 2006. However his main claim to fame is that in 2006 he came through qualifying to become the first Zambian and black African to play in the U.S. Open. He missed the cut. He played on the Nationwide Tour in 2010 where his best finish was T-7 at the Mylan Classic.

In July 2016, he won his first Sunshine Tour title in a Vodacom Origins of Golf Tour event, the first Zambian to win on the Sunshine Tour and only the fourth black African.

Professional wins (1)

Sunshine Tour wins (1)

Results in major championships

CUT = missed the half-way cut
Note: Muthiya only played in the U.S. Open.

References

External links

Zambian male golfers
New Mexico Lobos men's golfers
Sunshine Tour golfers
PGA Tour golfers
People from Kitwe
1983 births
Living people